Day One is the debut studio album from Birds of Tokyo, released on 3 February 2007 on independent label, Egg Records, through MGM Distribution. The album was recorded at Studio Couch, Fremantle, Sing Sing Studio, Melbourne, Big Rock Studio, Dunsborough, Loop Studios, West Perth and Underground Studios, Fremantle in late 2006. The album debuted and peaked at No. 88 on the ARIA Albums Chart.

The album garnered the band two Western Australian Music Industry Awards in 2007 and two again in 2008 (from a total of six nominations).

Three songs from the album received high rotation on Triple J, the album was also selected as iTunes album of the week and received two AIR Award nominations.

Three singles were released from the album, "Off Kilter" in 2006, "Black Sheets" and "Wayside" both in 2007.

Track listing

Charts

References

2007 debut albums
Birds of Tokyo albums